Turbo Assembler (sometimes shortened to the name of the executable, TASM)  is an assembler for software development published by Borland in 1989. It runs on and produces code for 16- or 32-bit x86 MS-DOS and compatible on Microsoft Windows. It can be used with Borland's other language products: Turbo Pascal, Turbo Basic, Turbo C, and Turbo C++. The Turbo Assembler package is bundled with Turbo Linker and is interoperable with Turbo Debugger.

Borland advertised Turbo Assembler as being 2-3 times faster than its primary competitor, Microsoft Macro Assembler (MASM). TASM can assemble source in a MASM-compatible mode or an ideal mode with a few enhancements. Object-Oriented programming was added in version 3. The last version of Turbo Assembler is 5.4, with files dated 1996 and patches up to 2010; it is still included with Delphi and C++Builder.

TASM itself is a 16-bit program. It will run on 16- and 32-bit versions of Windows, and produce code for the same versions, but it does not generate 64-bit x86 code.

Example
A Turbo Assembler program that prints 'Merry Christmas!':

.model small
.stack	100h
.data
msg	db "Merry Christmas!",'$'
.code
main	proc
    mov ax, SEG msg
	mov	ds, ax
	mov	dx, offset msg
	mov	ah, 9
	int	21h
	mov	ax, 4c00h
	int	21h
main	endp
end	main

See also
Comparison of assemblers
A86 - contemporary of Turbo Assembler
MASM - contemporary of Turbo Assembler
FASM - More recent x86 assembler

References

Notes
Swan, Tom (1989). Mastering Turbo Assembler. Carmel, Indiana: Howard W. Sams & Company, Hayden Books division of Macmillan Computer Publishing. . 2nd Edition, 1995 .

External links
 Mastering Turbo Assembler: Programming with Objects
 GUI Turbo Assembler (TASM) : A 64bit MuItilingual IDE for Assembly Language with TASM & TLINK by Lakhya Jyoti Nath

1989 software
Borland software
Assemblers
DOS software
Programming tools for Windows